8661 Ratzinger, provisional designation , is an Eoan asteroid from the outer region of the asteroid belt, approximately 13.4 kilometers in diameter. It was discovered on 14 October 1990, by German astronomers Lutz Schmadel and Freimut Börngen at the Karl Schwarzschild Observatory in Tautenburg, eastern Germany. The asteroid was named after Cardinal Joseph Ratzinger, who became Pope Benedict XVI.

Orbit and classification 

Ratzinger is a member of the Eos family, the largest asteroid family in the outer main belt consisting of nearly 10,000 asteroids. It orbits the Sun at a distance of 2.9–3.1 AU once every 5 years and 3 months (1,906 days). Its orbit has an eccentricity of 0.04 and an inclination of 11° with respect to the ecliptic.

Physical characteristics 

According to the survey carried out by NASA's Wide-field Infrared Survey Explorer with its subsequent NEOWISE mission, Ratzinger measures 13.4 kilometers in diameter and its surface has an albedo of 0.09. In 2018, Josef Ďurech et al. measured its rotation period as  hours and provided a partial shape model.

As of 2020, Ratzingers composition remains unknown.

Naming 

This minor planet was named after German Joseph Ratzinger (born 1927), then Cardinal and professor of theology, for the role he played in supervising the opening of the Vatican Secret Archives in 1998 to researchers investigating judicial errors against Galileo, after whom the minor planet 697 Galilea is named, and other medieval scientists.

Ratzinger was considered to be one of the most authoritative voices in the Vatican and became Pope Benedict XVI in 2005. The name was proposed by the asteroid's first discoverer, Lutz Schmadel. The approved naming citation was published by the Minor Planet Center on 23 May 2000.

References

External links 
 Asteroid Lightcurve Database (LCDB), query form (info )
 Dictionary of Minor Planet Names, Google books
 Asteroids and comets rotation curves, CdR – Observatoire de Genève, Raoul Behrend
 Discovery Circumstances: Numbered Minor Planets (5001)-(10000) – Minor Planet Center
 
 

008661
Discoveries by Lutz D. Schmadel
Discoveries by Freimut Börngen
Named minor planets
8661 Ratzinger
19901014